The Bone Bed is novel by Patricia Cornwell. It was published by G. P. Putnam's Sons in 2012. The book is a continuation of Cornwell's popular Kay Scarpetta series.

Synopsis
A woman has vanished while digging a dinosaur bone bed in the remote wilderness of Canada. Somehow, the only evidence has made its way to the inbox of Chief Medical Examiner Kay Scarpetta, over two thousand miles away in Boston. She has no idea why.

References 

2012 American novels
G. P. Putnam's Sons books
Novels by Patricia Cornwell